Samuel Arama is a Kenyan politician who has served as a member of the National Assembly for the Nakuru Town West constituency since 2013. He is a member of the Jubilee Party, having previously represented the Orange Democratic Movement.

Early life
Arama attended Nairobi Technical High School and worked as an accounts clerk at the Ministry of Public Works. Since 1994 he has been Managing Director at Ortama Electrical Supplies and Scomic Computers Stationeries.

Political career
Arama was elected to the national assembly in the 2013 Kenyan General Election, representing the Nakuru Town West constituency as a member of the Orange Democratic Movement. In the 2017 election he was re-elected as a member of the Jubilee Party. A legal challenge to his 2017 re-election was made by the ODM candidate Dr Andrew Isoe Ochoki but this was subsequently withdrawn.

As an MP he has campaigned for the legalisation of the brewing and sale of the traditional brew bussa.

In 2020 he was named as one of 19 members of the National Assembly who have not spoken on the floor of the parliament for the entire parliamentary session.
During the COVID-19 pandemic Arama donated food and protective equipment to church pastors in Nakuru.

Election results

"

Legal incidents

In 2015 Arama was accused of assaulting a voter in his constituency and in 2019 was accused of drawing a gun at a political opponent in a Nakuru church.

In June 2018 he was arrested on suspicion of land fraud along with his associate Kennedy Onkoba and detained over a weekend before being released on a Ksh 1m cash bail. He was charged with fraudulently acquiring land and conspiracy to commit fraud. In 2019 he was acquitted due to lack of evidence.

References

Members of the National Assembly (Kenya)
Jubilee Party politicians
Year of birth missing (living people)
Living people
Members of the 11th Parliament of Kenya
Members of the 12th Parliament of Kenya
Members of the 13th Parliament of Kenya